Clermont Township is a township in Adams County, North Dakota, United States. As of the 2010 census, its population was 35.

Clermont Township contains one city, Haynes.

References

Townships in Adams County, North Dakota
Townships in North Dakota